The 2009–10 College of Charleston Cougars men's basketball team represented the College of Charleston in the 2009–10 college basketball season. This was head coach Bobby Cremins's fourth season at College of Charleston. The Cougars compete in the Southern Conference and played their home games at Carolina First Arena. They finished the season 22–12, 14–4 in SoCon play and advanced to the semifinals of the 2010 Southern Conference men's basketball tournament before losing to Appalachian State. They were invited to the 2010 College Basketball Invitational where they advanced to the quarterfinals before losing to VCU.

Roster
Source

Schedule and results

|-
!colspan=9 style=| Exhibition

|-
!colspan=9 style=| Regular Season

|-
!colspan=9 style= | Southern Conference tournament

|-
!colspan=9 style=| CBI

References

College Of Charleston
College of Charleston Cougars men's basketball seasons
College Of Charleston
Charleston
Charleston